Apple sauce or applesauce is a purée (not necessarily served as a true sauce) made of apples.  It can be made with peeled or unpeeled apples and may be spiced or sweetened. Apple sauce is inexpensive and is widely consumed in North America and some parts of Europe.

A wide range of apple varieties are used to make apple sauce, depending on the preference for sweetness or tartness. Formerly, sour apples were used to make savory apple sauce.

Commercial versions of apple sauce are readily available at supermarkets and other retail outlets.

Preparation
	
Apple sauce is made by cooking apples with water or apple cider (fresh apple juice). More acidic apples will render a finer purée; the highly acidic Bramley apple creates a very fine purée. The apples may or may not be peeled. If they are not peeled, the peels and seeds are typically separated in a food mill. Sugar and spices such as cinnamon, allspice, and even Red Hot candies may be added for flavor. Lemon juice, citric acid, or other acidifiers may be used to preserve the color and ensure a high enough acidity for safe storage. Ascorbic acid (vitamin C) also preserves the color.

Apple sauce can be made by baking rather than boiling, in which case the apples are peeled and cored before cooking. The same process is applied when preparing the sauce in a slow cooker. 

Home or commercially canned apple sauce is sterilized by heat to preserve freshness.

Apple butter

Apple butter is a highly concentrated version of apple sauce. Its high concentration of sugar gives it a long shelf life.

Uses
Apple sauce is served as a side dish in northern Europe and North America. In the United States, packaged apple sauce is primarily branded as a children's snack, and is ubiquitous in school cafeterias.

In Sweden and Britain, it is commonly served with roast pork and goose. In British and Spanish cuisine, it is commonly served as pork chops and apple sauce. The Danish æbleflæsk combines the pork with apple sauce while cooking it.

In Central Europe it accompanies potato pancakes, in the Rhineland it is served with Reibekuchen. In Ashkenazi cuisine, it is the standard accompaniment for Hanukkah latkes. It also accompanies matzah brei.
Apple sauce is served with many foods in Germanic cuisine: Flurgönder (a smoked brawn), various kinds of Spätzle, Schupfnudeln, Swiss Älplermagronen, a kind of macaroni and cheese. In Netherlands and Belgian cuisine, apple sauce is part of the common dish of chicken, french fries, and apple sauce (kip, frieten/patat en appelmoes). It is especially popular among children, who dip their fries in mayonnaise first, then in apple sauce.

In many cuisines, apple sauce is a common accompaniment to blood sausage: the German Himmel und Erde; the Luxembourgian träipen and the French boudin noir. In fact the only French savory dish normally served with apple sauce (compote de pommes) is boudin sausage. It is also served with other sausage-like preparations, for example goetta and knipp.

Apple sauce may also be served as a dessert in most European cuisines, or used as an ingredient in applesauce cake. Apple sauce may be used as a sauce for Polish pierogi, Swedish Äggakaka, Ukrainian syrniki pancakes, Central European Palatschinken, Austrian Kaiserschmarrn and various kinds of sweet and savory dumplings (Knödel). In Scandinavian cuisine, it is sometimes served with breakfast filmjölk, a kind of fermented milk.

Formerly heavily sweetened and boiled-down apple sauce was prepared for winter storage. Made with sour apples, it was eaten with meat; made with sweet apples, it was eaten with tea.

In some recipes for baked goods, apple sauce can be used as a substitute for fat or eggs to make them low-fat or vegan.
Bavarian sweet mustard may be made with applesauce, and is typically served with Weißwurst (similar to boudin blanc) or Leberkäse (a sort of pâté).

Nutritional information
According to the USDA, a  reference amount of unsweetened applesauce is 82% water, 18% carbohydrates, and contains negligible fat and protein, while supplying  of food energy. It has an acidic pH between 3.3 and 3.6.

In therapeutic diets
The BRAT and CRAM diets include apple sauce given to children with diarrhea and stomach problems.

Economy
Apples are the third most internationally traded fruit, behind bananas and grapes. The global applesauce trade is expanding, with a market valued at US$ 1611.1 million in 2017 projected to reach US$ 2169.3 million by the end of the year 2026. This increase in demand can be attributed to an increase in interest for apple flavored products, with increased global consumption of apple flavored juices and sauces.

Applesauce is most commonly packaged in cups, jars, pouches, and cans. Applesauce cups are the largest segment of the applesauce market, comprising 40.9% of the revenue share in 2017.

Brick and mortar retail stores account for about 85% of the market share for applesauce, as compared to 15% among e-retailers.

Origins

Sauces made with apples date to at least the Middle Ages.

Apple butters were brought to the Americas by German immigrants such as the Moravians and Pennsylvania Dutch.  They are traditionally associated with the Appalachian region of the United States and Southern Pennsylvania.

See also

 Mott's, a major US producer
 Seneca Foods, a major US producer
 C.H. Musselman's, a brand owned by Knouse Foods
 Prigat, a major Israeli producer
 Three Threes Condiments, an Australian producer

References

External links

Sauce
Belgian cuisine
British cuisine
English cuisine
Dutch cuisine
German cuisine
American condiments